Stewards' Cup may refer to:

 Hong Kong Stewards' Cup a Thoroughbred horse race held at Sha Tin Racecourse in Hong Kong.
 Stewards' Cup (Great Britain), a Thoroughbred horse race held at Goodwood Racecourse in Great Britain
 Stewards' Cup (greyhounds), a leading UK greyhound competition
 Stewards' Challenge Cup, a rowing race at Henley Royal Regatta